Jake Woolmore (born 7 December 1990) is an English rugby union player who plays for Bristol Bears in the Premiership Rugby. His main position is loosehead prop.

Woolmore joined Exeter Chiefs in the summer of 2015, appearing in the A League and the Anglo-Welsh Cup, and also featured as a dual-registered player for former club Taunton Titans. Woolmore joined Jersey Reds in the RFU Championship as an emergency front-cover due to injuries before becoming a permanent deal from the 2016–17 season.

On 9 March 2018, Woolmore made his return to the Premiership with Bristol Bears ahead of the 2018–19 season.

References

External links
Bristol Bears Profile
ESPN Profile
Its Rugby Profile
Ultimate Rugby Profile

1990 births
Living people
Bristol Bears players
English rugby union players
Exeter Chiefs players
Jersey Reds players
Rugby union players from Hammersmith
Rugby union props